Madigai is a village in the Thanjavur taluk of Thanjavur district, Tamil Nadu, India.

Demographics 

As per the 2001 census, Madigai had a total population of 2067 with  1026 males and  1041 females. The sex ratio was 1015. The literacy rate was 71.3.

References 

 

Villages in Thanjavur district